Liu Junning (born 1961) is a Chinese political scientist and one of the most prominent liberal voices inside Chinese academia. He was known for his studies on modern European classical liberalism as well as conservatism. He is currently a researcher of Institute of Chinese Culture, a subsidiary of China's Ministry of Culture.

Liu is an opponent of what are called Asian values, including the view that Asia should take a different route of political development outside of the tradition of liberal democracy, seen as a Western principle. Liu believes liberalism is not simply a Western value, but should be something universal. He is also an admirer of American philosopher Ayn Rand. He does not support direct democracy, and views Jean-Jacques Rousseau as its primary proponent.

In 2001, Liu penned an article calling for reform in China and was expelled from Chinese Academy of Social Science and prohibited from travelling abroad. In 2009, the authority of Communist Party of China gave warnings to Liu along with two other intellectuals for their political advocacy contrary to the current regime and their signature on Charter 08.

References

External links
Liu Junning's blog

Living people
1961 births
Charter 08 signatories
Writers from Anhui
Chinese political scientists
Scientists from Anhui
Chinese classical liberals